A by-election was held for the New South Wales Legislative Assembly seat of Northern Tablelands on 25 May 2013. The by-election was triggered by the resignation of independent member Richard Torbay, which was announced on 20 March 2013. Adam Marshall was declared elected on 28 May 2013.

Dates

Background
The seat became vacant when the former Speaker of the New South Wales Legislative Assembly and Member for Northern Tablelands, Richard Torbay, who was the endorsed candidate for the Nationals for the federal seat of New England, suddenly resigned from State Parliament. Immediately prior to his resignation, the National disendorsed Torbay as preselected candidate for New England. It was claimed that his resignation was due to the controversy surrounding his ownership of more than twenty Centrelink buildings dating back to the era when John Howard was Prime Minister.

Former mayor of Gunnedah Shire, Adam Marshall, won preselection as the Nationals nominee ahead of Jock Laurie and Claire Coulton.

Controversies

One week prior to the by-election, Mal Peters, a councillor of Inverell Shire Council referred a matter of an undisclosed nature relating to Marshall to the Independent Commission Against Corruption. Marshall claimed that Peters' actions were spurious and questioned the timing of the complaint.

Candidates
The seven candidates in ballot paper order were:

Results

Richard Torbay resigned.

See also
 Electoral results for the district of Northern Tablelands
 List of New South Wales state by-elections

References

External links
 2013 Northern Tablelands by-election, Tally Room

2013 elections in Australia
New South Wales state by-elections
2010s in New South Wales
May 2013 events in Australia